Union J is the self-titled debut studio album by English boy band Union J. It was released in the United Kingdom on 28 October 2013 through RCA Records, and debuted at number six on the UK Albums Chart.

"Carry You" was released as the album's first single in June 2013 and reached number-six in the United Kingdom, marking the group's first top ten track. In September 2013, the band confirmed their second single would be "Beautiful Life". It was released on 21 October, preceding the release of their debut studio-album by one week. The third single was "Loving You Is Easy" which charted at number 9 in Ireland, and charted in the lower regions of the UK Singles Chart.

Union J promoted the album by embarking on their first headlining tour, the Magazines + TV Screens Tour, throughout December 2013 and January 2014, in support of their first record release.

Background and production
During a performance in Cardiff on 15 December 2012, Union J announced that they had signed a recording contract with Sony Music. On 28 January 2013, it was revealed that the record label was that of sub-division RCA Records and that the group would be releasing their debut single in June. On 14 January, it was announced that Union J were in London recording their debut single that day. On 12 January 2013, the band announced news of recording their debut single via Twitter: "Recording or first single on Monday! So sorry Belfast but we have to change the gig date, things are moving so fast for us! We'll be back! X". On 22 April, it was revealed that Union J's debut single "Carry You" would be released on 2 June.

On 5 June, the group revealed that their debut album was nearly finished, and were hoping to release it in either September or October. Speaking about the album, band member George Shelley revealed: "It all depends how well Carry You does because we've got loads of different sounds on our album at the moment that we’ve recorded. So if Carry You does well then we will do a second single that's sort of down that route and if it doesn’t do as well as we are hoping then we will do something a little different." The group later described their album as: "It's pop music but there's some stuff that people wouldn't expect. There's some funky summer vibes, some dance music, some ballads and a Californian vibe to it." On 4 September 2013, the album's artwork and title was revealed, and it was announced that it would be released on 28 October 2013.

Promotion
Union J performed "Carry You" live for the first time at Futurehits Live 2013. They also performed it on Britain's Got More Talent on 30 May 2013. They also sang it at Capital FM's Summertime Ball at Wembley Stadium on 9 June 2013 and at Chester Rocks 2013 on 15 June. In August 2013, it was announced the group would be supporting Selena Gomez on the European leg of her Stars Dance Tour in Lisbon. The song "Beethoven" was performed for the first time during their opening concert in Lisbon. They performed "Beautiful Life" on Friday Download on 25 October and on The Xtra Factor on 27 October. On 31 October, Union J appeared on Loose Women and performed "Beethoven".

Singles
On 8 April 2013, the group confirmed the title and release of their debut single, "Carry You". This was followed by the unveiling of the accompanying artwork, which also debuted the band's logo. The track was given its radio premiere on 22 April, which was followed by the upload of an audio version of the single on Union J's official Vevo account. Whilst explaining the meaning behind the single, band member Jaymi Hensley said, "The message of the song is [that] we've been on a massive rollercoaster the last year with each other, and it's about being there for each other." He also revealed, "It's there for the fans, we really wouldn't be here without them." On 30 March 2013, Union J announced via their official Twitter account that the music video for the single had been filmed. An official teaser for the video was uploaded to the group's Vevo account on 26 April 2013. The full video first premiered through Capital TV on 29 April. The single reached number six on the UK Singles Chart.

On 3 September 2013, the group announced that "Beautiful Life" would be released as their second single on 21 October 2013, a week ahead of the release of the album. During an interview on This Morning, Hensley explained that it was an old song that they had recorded before they auditioned for The X Factor: "Our fans come from all walks of life and the message behind the song is what the band stands for - that no matter where you come from or what you are, we are all the same." The track premiered on 9 September 2013. It arrived in at number four on The Vodafone Big Top 40 on 20 October 2013 and charted at number eight on the UK Singles Chart the following week.

"Loving You Is Easy" was announced to be the album's third single on 5 November 2013, on the band's Twitter account. The music video was released on 4 December 2013.

Reception

Track listing

Notes
All credits adapted from album liner notes.

Charts and certifications

Weekly charts

Year-end charts

Certifications

Release history

References 

2013 debut albums
RCA Records albums
Syco Music albums
Union J albums